Hialeah-Miami Lakes Senior High School is a public high school operated by Miami-Dade County Public Schools, located at 7977 West Twelfth Avenue in Hialeah, Florida, United States, on the boundary with the city of Miami Lakes.

As of the 2021-22 school year, the school had an enrollment of 1,300 students and 95.0 classroom teachers (on an FTE basis), for a student–teacher ratio of 18.1:1. There were 1,278 students (74.5% of enrollment) eligible for free lunch and 113 (6.6% of students) eligible for reduced-cost lunch.

History

Construction
Hialeah-Miami Lakes Senior High opened its doors in 1971; the school was built to serve the newly formed community of Miami Lakes, Florida as well as parts of the cities of Opa-Locka and Hialeah, Florida. It is one of five high schools serving the densely populated Miami suburb of Hialeah, Florida.

Demographics
Hialeah-Miami Lakes is 70% Hispanic (of any race), 21% Black, 6% White non-Hispanic, and 3% Asian.

Achievements

Hialeah-Miami Lakes Senior participates in the Florida High School Mock Trial Competition and the National High School Mock Trial Competition.  Hialeah-Miami Lakes Senior received Miami-Dade County Championships in 1991, 1992, 1993, 1994 and placed 2nd in 1995.  The school received Florida State Championships in 1991, 1992, 1993, and placed 2nd in 1994.  Hialeah-Miami Lakes Senior, under the instruction of Walter Gishler and Anthony DeFillippo, received National High School Mock Trial Honors placing 7th in 1991, 5th in 1993 and National Champions in 1992.

In 2006-2007, the Hialeah-Miami Lakes Theatre/Drama Department earned straight superior ratings at the Southeastern Theatre Conference. Representing not only their school but M-DCPS and the entire state of Florida as well, they earned straight superior ratings for the production of From the Mississippi Delta. The Drama program continued its excellence throughout the 2007-2008 school year with its one act interpretation of Beckett's Waiting for Godot which earned an invitation to the prestigious 2009 Edinburgh Theater Festival in Scotland.

Grades
Hialeah-Miami Lakes improved from a D in 2011, to a B in 2012, and further improved to an A in 2014. Hialeah-Miami Lakes is now a B school on the 2018-2019 school year.

Academics
Lakes offers more Advanced Placement courses in its curriculum than most of the schools in Dade county, numbering a total of 23 AP classes.
The AP courses offered for the 2018-2019 school year are:

 Psychology
 Biology
 Chemistry
 Environmental Science
 Calculus (AB & BC)
 European History
 United States History
 World History
 English Language
 French Language
 Spanish Language
 Spanish Literature
 Human Geography
 United States Government & Politics
 Studio Art
 Music Theory

Extra curricular
Hialeah-Miami Lakes offers over 30 clubs and organizations, including Army JROTC. A message from the activities director, "Activities enrich the curriculum of the school by making available a wide variety of experiences in which a student can participate. Each student has the opportunity to join the many clubs available. However, a student can be a member of only one service club. It is possible for students to request a new club or activity if at least fifteen (15) students show an interest and a faculty sponsor is available. Before a new club can be formed the Director of Student Activities must be consulted."

iPrep

The school has the "iPrep Academy", which receives an entire floor dedicated to the students as well as other classrooms around the school and the students that attend the academy also receive a Mac. iPrep is a magnet academy, exclusive to 100 students that are hand-picked by the school. Students also take FLVS (Florida Virtual School) courses on their Macs or in the library.

Athletics
Hialeah-Miami Lakes High School has won multiple Florida state sports championships, including the 1972 and 1973 undefeated Boys Waterpolo State Champions and the 1972 and 1973 undefeated Girls Waterpolo State Champions, the 1975 football state championship, four state championships in baseball (1977, 1979, 1980, and 1985), one in boys' soccer (1978), one in boys' golf (1978), one in boys' gymnastics (1978), one in boys' track (1984), one in boys' basketball (1986), and one in girls' soccer (1993), as well as a national baseball championship in 1985. Hialeah-Miami Lakes High was also awarded the Miami Herald All Sport Award for seven seasons (1977–78, 1979–80, 1980–81, 1982–83, 1983–84, 1984–85, and 1989–90) as well as the Miami Herald Major Sport Award (1977–78 and 1978–79). Hialeah-Miami Lakes High shares a rivalry with Hialeah High and a less notable one with Barbara Goleman Senior High.

Feeder patterns
The following elementary schools feed into Hialeah-Miami Lakes:
M. A. Milam
Bunche Park
John G. Dupuis
Golden Glades
Miami Lakes K-8 center
North Twin Lakes
Nathan B. Young
Palm Lakes
Rainbow Park
Twin Lakes

The following middle schools feed into Hialeah-Miami Lakes:

Miami Lakes Middle
 North Dade
 M.A. Milam K-8 Center
 Palm Springs Middle School

Notable alumni

Armando Allen (born 1989, class of 2007), NFL running back for the Chicago Bears
Cristian Amigo, composer and guitarist
Frank Artiles (born 1973), Florida House of Representatives for District 119 in Florida
Devin Bush (born 1973), former NFL free safety for the Atlanta Falcons (1995–1998), the St. Louis Rams (1999–2000) and the Cleveland Browns (2001–2002).
Maria Canals-Barrera (born 1966), actress
Elizabeth Caballero, international opera singer, Class of 1993
Rene Capo (1961-2009), United States Olympic representative as a judoka
Johndale Carty (born 1977), former NFL defensive back
Samuel Charles (born 1985), football wide receiver for the Spokane Empire
Chris Corchiani (born 1968), professional NBA guard for Orlando Magic after being picked in the second round of the 1991 NBA Draft from North Carolina State University and later on the Boston Celtics as well as the Washington Bullets
Vincent D'Onofrio (born 1959), actor and producer, known for stage, film and television work. Best known for his role as Detective Robert Goren in Law & Order: Criminal Intent and Wilson Fisk in Daredevil
Rohan Davey (born 1978), NFL quarterback for the New England Patriots (2002–2004), switched on to the Arizona Cardinals, also helped lead the win of the NFL Europe World Bowl for the Berlin Thunder
Alberto Fernandez (born 1958), State Department official, US Ambassador to Equatorial Guinea
Wifredo A. Ferrer (born 1966), United States Attorney for the Southern District of Florida
Jamari Lattimore (born 1988), NFL linebacker for the Green Bay Packers
Thad Lewis (born 1987, class of 2006), NFL quarterback
Manny Lora (born 1991, class of 2008), baseball coach
Joe Menendez (born 1969, class of 1987), television director
José R. Oliva (born 1973, class of 1991), Florida House of Representatives for District 110 and CEO of Oliva cigars
Javier Ortiz (outfielder) (born 1963, class of 1981), former professional baseball player for the Houston Astros
Julio Robaina (born 1965), Mayor of the city of Hialeah, Florida as of 2005
Edel Rodriguez (born 1971), Time Magazine art director, illustrator, children's book author
Carlos Serrao, photographer
Sara Sidner, journalist
Michael Timpson (born 1967, class of 1985), NFL wide receiver for the New England Patriots for six seasons (1989–1994)
Rocco Valdes (born 1980), record executive and music producer

References

External links 

Hialeah-Miami Lakes' homepage

Educational institutions established in 1971
Miami-Dade County Public Schools high schools
Education in Hialeah, Florida
1971 establishments in Florida